Radio Slobomir is a Bosnian local commercial radio station, broadcasting from Bijeljina, Bosnia and Herzegovina. This radio station broadcasts a variety of programs such as popular pop and folk music with local news.

The program is mainly produced in Serbian at five FM frequencies and it is available in the city of Bijeljina as well as in nearby municipalities in Semberija  Bosansko Podrinje area.

The owner of the local radio station is the company RADIO TELEVIZIJA SLOBOMIR D.o.o. Slobomir  which also operates RTV Slobomir.

Estimated number of listeners of Radio Slobomir is around 268.917.

Frequencies
 Bijeljina 
 Doboj 
 Majevica 
 Zvornik 
 Vlasenica

See also 
 List of radio stations in Bosnia and Herzegovina
 Daš Radio
 Daš Extra Radio
 BN Radio
 Bobar Radio
 Bobar Radio - Studio B2
 RSG Radio

References

External links 
 www.rtvslobomir.com
 www.radiostanica.ba
 www.fmscan.org
 Communications Regulatory Agency of Bosnia and Herzegovina

Bijeljina
Radio stations established in 2005
Bijeljina
Mass media in Bijeljina